opened in Sakata, Yamagata Prefecture, Japan in 1997. Located on a small hill with views over the city as well as towards Mount Chōkai and the Mogami River, the collection focuses on works in the western tradition by Japanese artists.

See also

 List of Cultural Properties of Japan - paintings (Yamagata)
 Homma Museum of Art
 Yamagata Museum of Art

References

External links
  Sakata City Museum of Art

Sakata, Yamagata
Museums in Yamagata Prefecture
Art museums and galleries in Japan
Museums established in 1997
1997 establishments in Japan